Sandeep Bakhshi (born 28 May 1960) is an Indian banker, and the MD & CEO, ICICI Bank since October 2018.

Early life
Bakhshi earned a degree in mechanical engineering from Punjab Engineering College, Chandigarh, and has a postgraduate degree in management from XLRI - Xavier School of Management, Jamshedpur.

Career
Bakhshi, an employee of ICICI since 1986, was appointed as MD & CEO in June 2018. Prior to this, he was the managing director and CEO of ICICI Prudential Life Insurance from August 2010 to June 2018 and MD and CEO for ICICI Lombard General Insurance Company in April 2002.

References

Living people
Indian bankers
Chief operating officers
1960s births
Punjab Engineering College alumni
XLRI – Xavier School of Management alumni
ICICI Bank